St. Joseph's Episcopal Church is a historic African-American Episcopal parish church complex located at Fayetteville, Cumberland County, North Carolina. Its historic church at Ramsey and Moore Streets was built in 1896. It is a low, shingled, Queen Anne style frame church with English Gothic and Spanish accents.  It features a three-part stained glass window, deeply projecting semi-octagonal chancel, and steeply pitched main roof with exposed rafters. Also on the property are the contributing Parish House and Parsonage. It was chartered in 1873, and is the second oldest Episcopal congregation in Fayetteville.

It was listed on the National Register of Historic Places in 1982.

References

External links
 St, Joseph's Episcopal Church

African-American history of North Carolina
Episcopal church buildings in North Carolina
Churches in Fayetteville, North Carolina
Churches on the National Register of Historic Places in North Carolina
Queen Anne architecture in North Carolina
Gothic Revival church buildings in North Carolina
Churches completed in 1896
19th-century Episcopal church buildings
National Register of Historic Places in Cumberland County, North Carolina